Khash (known by the derivations khashi and , respectively) is a dish of boiled cow or sheep parts, which might include the head, feet, and stomach (tripe).

Khash and its variations are traditional dishes in Afghanistan, Albania, Armenia, Azerbaijan, Bosnia and Herzegovina, Bulgaria, Georgia, Greece, Iran, Iraq, Turkey, North Macedonia, Mongolia and some Persian Gulf countries.

Etymology 
The name khash originates from the Armenian verb, which means "to boil". The dish, initially called khashoy, is mentioned by a number of medieval Armenian authors, including Grigor Magistros (11th century), Mkhitar Heratsi (12th century), and Yesayi Nchetsi (13th century).

The Persian designation pacha stems from the term , literally meaning "trotter". The combination of a sheep's head and trotters is called , which literally means "head [and] trotter" in Persian.

In the South Caucasus 

Khash is a purist meal with great parsimony in ingredients. The feet are depilated, cleaned, kept in cold water in order to get rid of bad smell, and boiled in water all night long, until the water has become a thick broth and the meat has separated from the bones. No salt or spices are added during the boiling process. The dish is served hot. One may add salt, garlic, lemon juice, or vinegar according to one's taste. Dried lavash is often crumbled into the broth to add substance. Khash is generally served with a variety of other foods, such as hot green and yellow peppers, pickles, radishes, cheese, and fresh greens such as cress. The meal is almost always accompanied by vodka (preferably mulberry vodka) and mineral water.

In Georgia, khashi is served together with garlic, milk, salt and chacha. Usually they eat this dish early morning, or during hangovers.

In the medieval Armenian medical textbook Relief of Fevers (1184), khash was described as a dish with healing properties, e.g., against snuffle. It was recommended to eat it while drinking wine. In case of ailment, khash from the legs of a yeanling (lamb or kid) was advised.

Formerly a nutritious winter food, it is now considered a delicacy, and is enjoyed as a festive winter meal. Modern-day convention in Armenia dictates that it should be consumed during the month that has an r in its name, thus excluding May, June, July, and August (month names in Armenian are derivatives of the Latin names). Khash is traditionally consumed during cold months in Azerbaijan and Georgia.

In the South Caucasus, khash is often seen as food to be consumed in the mornings after a party, as it is known to battle hangovers (especially by men) and eaten with a "hair of the dog" vodka chaser.

There is much ritual involved in khash parties. Many participants abstain from eating the previous evening, and insist upon using only their hands to consume the unusual (and often unwieldy) meal. Because of the potency and strong smell of the meal, and because it is eaten early in the mornings and so often enjoyed in conjunction with alcohol, khash is usually served on the weekend or on holidays.

In Iran 

Kalle-pache (literally meaning "head [and] trotter") consists of a sheep's head (including the brain) and trotters, and is typically seasoned with lemon and cinnamon. Usually consumed as a breakfast soup, kalle-pache is traditional to Afghanistan and Iran.

In Iran, kalle-pache is usually cooked in specialty stores, and is served in the morning. It is especially consumed during cold seasons. To prepare kalle-pache, the sheep's head and trotters are collected, cooked, and treated as per the recipe.

In Israel 
During winter, it is very common to eat sheep or cow parts in soup with onions, spices and squeezed lemon and is prepared in many ways such as maraq regel (leg soup), maraq moh (brain soup), maraq me'ayim (intestine soup), maraq beten (tripe soup) and maraq rosh (head soup). It is usually accompanied with flat bread, lemon, hot chilli pepper and an alcoholic drink, usually arak.

In Iraq 
Pacha is a traditional Iraqi dish made from sheep's head, trotters, and stomach; all boiled slowly and served with bread sunken in the broth. The cheeks and tongues are considered the best parts. Many people prefer not to eat the eyeballs, which could be removed before cooking. The stomach lining would be filled with rice and lamb and stitched with a sewing thread. Sheep brain is also included.

In Arab countries 

The dish is known in Kuwait, Bahrain, and other Persian Gulf countries as Pacheh, since the Arabic alphabet has no letters 'p' and 'ch' so the dish is written with 'b' and 'j' as in Bajeh ). A variation of that is found in other Arab countries such as in Egypt and is known as kawari''', Egyptians eat cow brain and sheep brain.

 In Albania 
Albania's popular pache consists of a sheep's or any cattle's head, that is boiled until meat comes off easily. It is then stewed with garlic, onion, black pepper, and vinegar. Sometimes a little flour is added to thicken the stew. It is also frequently cooked with cattle feet or tripe. It makes a hot and hearty winter stew.

 In Turkey 
In Turkish culinary culture, pacha is a generic word for certain soup preparations, especially with offal, but also without it. In most parts of Turkey, such as in Kastamonu, for instance, the term  ("feet pacha") is used for cow, sheep, or goat hooves, and the term  is used for "head pacha" (chorba). In Turkey, the word  refers to a sheep's head roasted in the oven, which is served after grilling at specialized offal restaurants.

 In Greece 

The Greek version, called patsás (πατσάς), may be seasoned with red wine vinegar and garlic (skordostoubi), or thickened with avgolémono. The Greek version sometimes uses calf feet with the tripe.

Specialized tavernas serving patsa are known as patsatzidika. Because patsas has the reputation of remedying hang-over and aiding digestion, patsatzidika'' are often working overnight, serving people returning home after dinner or clubbing.

Similar dishes 
 Paya, South Asian version of this dish
 Smalahove, boiled sheep's head, a traditional western Norwegian food
 Soğuk paça, a Turkish cold dish made with the jelly obtained from sheep or cow hooves
 Svið, an Icelandic dish that includes a sheep's head cut in half

See also 

 Aspic
 Beshbarmak
 Chitterlings
 Haggis
 Head cheese
 Powsowdie
 Tripe chorba

References

External links
 
 
 
 

Albanian cuisine
Armenian cuisine
Armenian words and phrases
Assyrian cuisine
Azerbaijani cuisine
Bahraini cuisine
Beef dishes
Bosnia and Herzegovina cuisine
Bulgarian cuisine
Cuisine of Georgia (country)
Greek cuisine
Iranian cuisine
Iraqi cuisine
Kuwaiti cuisine
Middle Eastern cuisine
National dishes
Offal
Soviet cuisine
Turkish cuisine